WRBD (1230 AM) is a commercial radio station in Gainesville, Florida, broadcasting to the Gainesville-Ocala, Florida area.

History
WRBD began broadcasting in February 1948 as WGGG on 1230 kHz with 250 watts of power. The station was owned by Alachua County Broadcasting Company. They were originally a popular music station with their offices, studios, transmitter, and antenna-tower located near the Gainesville airport at 1230 Waldo Rd., northeast of downtown Gainesville.

On November 13, 2017, the station re-branded as The Goat.

The station flipped to Christmas music since after the holiday season until sometime in June 2022.
The station eventually flipped to urban contemporary in October 2022 under ownership of William Johnson's Urban One Broadcasting Network, LLC.

Previous logo

References

External links
History of WGGG from Central Florida Radio

RBD (AM)
Radio stations established in 1948
1948 establishments in Florida
Urban contemporary radio stations in the United States